Parker Alan Bridwell (born August 2, 1991) is an American former professional baseball pitcher. The Baltimore Orioles selected Bridwell in the ninth round of the 2010 MLB draft. He made his Major League Baseball (MLB) debut in 2016.  He has played in MLB for the Orioles and the Los Angeles Angels. He signed a minor league deal with the Minnesota Twins on January 28, 2020.

Career

Amateur career
Bridwell attended Hereford High School in Hereford, Texas, where he was a three-sport athlete, playing baseball, American football, and basketball. In American football, he played quarterback and punter. In baseball, he played as a pitcher, and was named to the All-State third-team by the Texas Sports Writers Association. He committed to attend Texas Tech University and play college baseball and college football for the Texas Tech Red Raiders.

Baltimore Orioles
The Baltimore Orioles selected Bridwell in the ninth round of the 2010 MLB draft. The Orioles offered Bridwell a $750,000 signing bonus. When MLB refused to approve it, he signed with Baltimore for a $625,000 bonus. In 2011, Bridwell played for the Aberdeen Ironbirds of the Class A-Short Season New York–Penn League, and was named their Opening Day starting pitcher. Bridwell spent two seasons with the Delmarva Shorebirds of the Class A South Atlantic League. In 2014, he pitched for the Frederick Keys of the Class A-Advanced Carolina League. On May 19, he was named the Carolina League's pitcher of the week. The Orioles assigned Bridwell to the Arizona Fall League after the 2014 season. Bridwell played for the Bowie Baysox of the Class AA Eastern League in 2015, and was added to the Orioles' 40-man roster after the season.

Bridwell began the 2016 season with the Norfolk Tides of the Class AAA International League. The Orioles promoted him to the major leagues on August 21. He pitched in two games for Baltimore. In the second, he allowed a grand slam, and he was optioned to the minor leagues after the game.

Los Angeles Angels
The Orioles traded Bridwell to the Los Angeles Angels for cash considerations on April 17, 2017. He earned a spot in the Angels' starting rotation. Bridwell got his first extended look in the majors, pitching in 21 games, 20 starts, 73 strikeouts in 121 innings. He finished with a 10–3 record with a 3.64 ERA. His nine straight road wins to begin a career was tied with Brooklyn Dodgers' Clem Labine for second-longest such streak all-time, behind that of Whitey Ford.

Bridwell did not pitch in most of the 2018 season due to right elbow inflammation.  He was 1–0 in  innings. On November 20, 2018, he was designated for assignment.

Later career
The New York Yankees claimed Bridwell off waivers on November 26, 2018. The Yankees designated Bridwell for assignment on December 17.

Bridwell was re-claimed by the Angels on December 21. He was once again designated for assignment on January 15, 2019. On January 22, 2019, Bridwell was claimed off waivers by the Oakland Athletics. Bridwell was outrighted off the roster on January 25. He was released on April 6. On April 9, 2019, Bridwell signed a minor league deal with the Los Angeles Angels. He became a free agent following the 2019 season.

On January 28, 2020, Bridwell signed a minor league deal with the Minnesota Twins. He became a free agent on November 2, 2020.

References

External links

1991 births
Living people
Baseball players from Texas
Major League Baseball pitchers
Baltimore Orioles players
Los Angeles Angels players
Gulf Coast Orioles players
Aberdeen IronBirds players
Delmarva Shorebirds players
Frederick Keys players
Glendale Desert Dogs players
Bowie Baysox players
Norfolk Tides players
Peoria Javelinas players
Mobile BayBears players
Salt Lake Bees players
People from Hereford, Texas